Elisabetta Di Prisco (born 26 March 1950) is a former Italian politician. She was a member of the Chamber of Deputies for the Italian Communist Party and the Democratic Party of the Left between 1987 and 1994.

Early life 
Di Prisco was born on 26 March 1950 in Verona, Italy. She worked as a lecturer at the Academy of Fine Arts, Verona and as a scene painter. She served as the head of the women's committee and a member of the regional committee for the Italian Communist Party (PCI).

Political career 
She was elected to the Chamber of Deputies in the 1987 general election on 2 July 1987 as a representative for Verona-Padua-Vicenza-Rovigo. She served as a member on the committee for culture, science and teaching.

She was re-elected in the 1992 general election on 21 April 1992 as a member for the Democratic Party of the Left (PDS). She served as secretary of the Parliamentary Commission for the General Address and Supervision of the Radio and Television Services and as a member of the education commission. She left office on 14 April 1994.

External links

References 

Living people
1950 births
People from Verona
Deputies of Legislature XI of Italy
Deputies of Legislature X of Italy
Democratic Party of the Left politicians
Italian Communist Party politicians
20th-century Italian women politicians